Predator  is a superyacht built in 2008 at the Dutch shipyard Royal De Vries Aalsmeer. The interior design of the Predator was done by Bannenberg Designs and the exterior by De Voogt Naval Architects.

Design 
The hull is steel, with the superstructure made of aluminium. The yacht is Lloyd's registered, issued by Cayman Islands.

Engines 

See also 
 List of motor yachts by length
 List of yachts built by Feadship
 Motor yacht

References 

2008 ships
Motor yachts
Ships built in the Netherlands
Individual yachts